1995–96 Pirveli Liga was the 7th season of the Georgian Pirveli Liga. The 1995–96 season saw 29 teams in competition: 19 in the Eastern zone, and 20 in the Western zone. Pirveli Liga is the second division of Georgian football. It consists of reserve and professional teams.

Eastern zone

Western zone

Promoted to First Division: Samgurali.

See also
1995–96 Umaglesi Liga
1995–96 Georgian Cup

Erovnuli Liga 2 seasons
2
Georgia